Georgi Aleksandrovich Yumatov (11 March 1926 – 6 October 1997) was a Soviet and Russian film actor. He appeared in 72 films between 1946 and 1994. He was a People’s Artist of the RSFSR (1982).

Biography
Yumatov was born on 11 March 1926 in Moscow into a Russian family. A veteran of the Great Patriotic War. During 1941—1942 he studied at the Naval School. In 1942 he was enrolled as a cabin boy on the torpedo boat "The Brave", and a year later he became its helmsman. He participated in the siege of Budapest. He distinguished himself in the battle for Vienna in the assault on the bridge. During this battle he was awarded the Medal of Ushakov. He was wounded several times and also shell-shocked.

After the war he returned to Moscow and was noticed by Grigori Aleksandrov in a cafe. He invited Yumatov for a small part in his upcoming comedy Spring (1947). After that Aleksandrov took him to Sergei Gerasimov and suggested to try him as a student at VGIK, but Gerasimov answered: «I have nothing to teach him. He has a natural gift». He showed Yumatov to the State Theater of Movie Actors and in a couple of years cast him in the top-grossing film The Young Guard. This launched Yumatov's film career.

Between 1950 and 1970 he performed in many popular war and action films, usually portraying heroic, yet down-to-earth lads with a glimpse of humour. His personal favourite role was Venka Malyshev from the 1959 film Cruelty. In 1971 he played the main part in Officers alongside Vasily Lanovoy. While Yumatov didn't have much regard for this role nor for the film, it quickly turned into a cult classic. Seen by 53.4 million viewers at the time of release, it became his most recognizable film and was given a second birth in 2011 after colorization.

Around the same time Yumatov started drinking heavily. It was speculated that the reason for this was his wife — an actress Muza Krepkogorskaya — who refused to have children. They met at VGIK during the 1940s and lived together up till Yumatov's death. Krepkogorskaya was never as popular as her husband, even though he made sure that she was given at least minor roles in every movie he appeared in. She was afraid that pregnancy might ruin her chance to perform «the role of her life» and kept making abortions. At one point she made an abortion when she was four months pregnant and lost the ability to give birth at all. It became a great shock for Yumatov.

Despite the big success of Officers, his career started going downhill. During the 1980s he performed in several popular crime TV series, but with the collapse of the USSR he was left without any job. In 1994 Yumatov shot dead a 33-year-old janitor who helped him bury his dog. Investigation showed that after the burial they drank in the dog's memory, and the janitor told Georgi that he regretted Nazis hadn't won the war. Yumatov, a war veteran, couldn't stand it and started a fight, during which he was wounded in the head with a kitchen knife. The actor then grabbed a trophy rifle from the wall and shot the janitor. He spent two months in prison, but was pardoned following the 1995 amnesty dedicated to 50 years since the Soviet victory in the Great Patriotic War.

After that he stopped drinking, started visiting church and spent all his time with his wife. Yet the following years saw a quick demise of his health. On 9 May 1997 he made his last appearance on public in a popular TV show Pole Chudes dedicated to the war victory. Soon he was diagnosed with aortic aneurysm. He went through a hard surgery, but it didn't help and on 4 October 1997 he died. He was buried at the Vagankovo Cemetery. In two years his wife Muza Krepkogorskaya also died.

Selected filmography

Honours and awards
Order of the Patriotic War 2nd class
Ushakov Medal
Medal "For the Capture of Vienna"
Medal "For the Capture of Budapest"
Medal "For the Victory over Germany in the Great Patriotic War 1941–1945"
Jubilee Medal "Twenty Years of Victory in the Great Patriotic War 1941-1945"
Jubilee Medal "Thirty Years of Victory in the Great Patriotic War 1941-1945"
Jubilee Medal "Forty Years of Victory in the Great Patriotic War 1941-1945"
Jubilee Medal "50 Years of Victory in the Great Patriotic War 1941-1945"
Honoured Artist of the RSFSR

References

External links

1926 births
1997 deaths
Soviet male film actors
Male actors from Moscow
Soviet military personnel of World War II
Recipients of the Medal of Zhukov
People's Artists of the RSFSR
Burials at Vagankovo Cemetery
Soviet murderers
Russian murderers